Metropolitan Theatre may refer to:
 Wang Theatre, formerly the Metropolitan Theatre, in Boston, Massachusetts
 Metropolitan Theatre (Winnipeg), a National Historic Site of Canada
 Medellín Metropolitan Theatre in Medellín, Colombia
 Manila Metropolitan Theater, a theater in the Philippines
 Grauman's Metropolitan Theatre or Paramount Theatre, a theater in Los Angeles, California
 Metropolitan Theatre (Cleveland, Ohio) or Agora Theatre and Ballroom
 Metropolitan Theatre (Morgantown, West Virginia)
 The Metropolitan Theatre, a West End music hall in London
 Metropolitan Opera House (Philadelphia), or The Met, a theater in Philadelphia, Pennsylvania

See also
 Teatro Metropólitan, Mexico City